L’Éclipse is a downhill ski course in Courchevel, France, opened in 2022. It was designed by Bruno Tuaire and Hannes Trinkl and built for the 2023 World Championships, and will host five men's alpine events.

In March 2022, it hosted the speed events of the World Cup finals for men and women.

The "Roc de Fer" ski course in nearby Méribel and L’Éclipse are co-hosting the World Championships in 2023.

This black course has a maximum incline of 31.4 degrees (61% gradient) and one of the steepest average inclines in the world with 16.7 degrees (30%), even more than dowhnill in Kitzbühel (27%) or Wengen (26%). 

The finish area is adjacent to Tremplin du Praz, the ski jumping venue of the 1992 Winter Olympics.

History 
On 16 March 2022, this course originally intended for men only, was officially opened with both men's and women's downhill events, as the upper part of the "Roc de Fer" women's ski course in Méribel wasn't fully rebuilt yet.

Events

World Championships

World Cup

Course sections 
Saut du Zenith – Mur du Son – Le S Des Arolles – Saut Des Jockeys – Le Trou Noir – Mur De La Bux – L'Envol – Le Mur Des Braves

References

External links 
 L’Éclipse skiparadise.es
 courchevelmeribel2023

Alpine skiing in France
Skiing in France
Alpine skiing competitions in France
International sports competitions hosted by France